DAOY may refer to:
DAOY (biology)
El Bayadh Airport, airport code in Algeria